Chelosphargis is an extinct genus of sea turtle from Upper Cretaceous of Alabama. Only one species has been described, Chelosphargis advena.

References

External links
Life History: Geologic History of Sea Turtles

Late Cretaceous turtles of North America
Protostegidae
Extinct animals of North America
Prehistoric turtle genera